Matthew Don Bauscher (born April 25, 1985) is an American former professional basketball player. Bauscher played three years for the Boise State Broncos, from 2005 till 2008, during his college career. He was the team captain at Boise State while winning the regular season and tournament championship. He earned All Conference Defense and All Conference Tournament Team. Afterwards he played six seasons as a professional player in Europe, spending most of his time in the Netherlands, in the Dutch Basketball League (DBL). Bauscher won the DBL championship in 2010. He also played in top divisions of Germany and Cyprus.

Professional career
After playing three years for Boise State, Bauscher started his professional playing career in the Netherlands with Aris Leeuwarden in the Dutch Basketball League. He was the DBL Scoring champion during the 2008–09 season, as he averaged 22 points per game.

After his single season for Aris, Bauscher signed with GasTerra Flames of the DBL. In his first season with the Flames, he won the Dutch championship, and in his second season he won the NBB Cup.

In 2012, Bauscher signed with BG Göttingen in the Basketball Bundesliga (BBL) in Germany.

After one year in Germany, Bauscher returned to the Netherlands to play for EiffelTowers Den Bosch. With Den Bosch, he won the NBB Cup for the second time in his career.

In 2013, Bauscher signed with AEK Larnaca in Cyprus.

In August 2014, Bauscher retired from professional basketball. Matt Bauscher currently runs a real estate business in Boise, Idaho. He has sold over 100 homes every year since 2016 – becoming one of the top realtors in the United States. In 2020 alone, he sold 227 homes for $130,000,000 in sales.

Honours

Club
GasTerra Flames
Dutch Basketball League (1): 2009–10
NBB Cup (1): 2010–11
EiffelTowers Den Bosch
NBB Cup (1): 2012–13

Individual
DBL scoring leader (1): 2008–09
DBL assists leader (1): 2008–09
DBL Statistical Player of the Year (1): 2008–09
DBL All-Star Game MVP (1): 2009
DBL All-Star (3): 2009, 2010, 2011

References

1985 births
Living people
AEK Larnaca B.C. players
American expatriate basketball people in Belgium
American expatriate basketball people in Cyprus
American expatriate basketball people in Germany
American expatriate basketball people in Greece
American expatriate basketball people in Italy
American expatriate basketball people in the Netherlands
American expatriate basketball people in Russia
American expatriate basketball people in Turkey
American men's basketball players
Aris Leeuwarden players
Basketball players from Idaho
BG Göttingen players
Boise State Broncos men's basketball players
Heroes Den Bosch players
Donar (basketball club) players
Dutch Basketball League players
Junior college men's basketball players in the United States
People from Caldwell, Idaho
Shooting guards